Combat Stress is a registered charity in the United Kingdom offering therapeutic and clinical community and residential treatment to former members of the British Armed Forces who are suffering from a range of mental health conditions; including post traumatic stress disorder (PTSD).  Combat Stress makes available treatment for all Veterans who are suffering with mental illness free of charge.

On average, it takes 13 years for a Veteran to first contact with Combat Stress for advice, help, and treatment; however for those who served in Iraq (Gulf War I and Gulf War II) and Afghanistan, the time period is much lower.

The charity was formed in 1919, as the Ex-Servicemen's Welfare Society, following World War I; when the effects of shell shock were becoming known.

History before 1919

World War I

Soldiers (and other frontline personnel) returning home from World War I suffered greatly from the horrors of war that they had witnessed.  Many returning veterans suffered from what was then known as shell shock; now known as post traumatic stress disorder (PTSD).

In 1915, the British Army in France was instructed that:

In August 1916, Charles Myers was made Consulting Psychologist to the Army.  He hammered home the notion that it was necessary to create special centres near the line using treatment based on:
Promptness of action;
Suitable environment;
Psychotherapeutic measures.
He also used hypnosis with limited success.

In December 1916, Gordon Holmes was put in charge of the northern, and more important, part of the western front.  He had much more of the tough attitudes of the Army, and suited the prevailing military mindset, and so his view prevailed.  By June 1917, all British cases of 'shell-shock' were evacuated to a nearby neurological centre, and were labelled as NYDN – 'not yet diagnosed nervous'.  "But, because of the Adjutant-General's distrust of doctors, no patient could receive that specialist attention until Form AF 3436 had been sent off to the man’s unit and filled in by his commanding officer."  This created significant delays, but demonstrated that between 4-10% of shell-shock W cases were 'commotional' (due to physical causes), and the rest were 'emotional'.  This killed off shell-shock as a valid disease, and it was abolished in September 1918.

During the war, 306 British soldiers were executed for cowardice; many of whom were victims of shell shock.  On 7 November 2006, the Government of the United Kingdom gave them all a posthumous conditional pardon.  The Shot at Dawn Memorial at the National Memorial Arboretum in Staffordshire commemorates these men.

Present work

Combat Stress was formed at a time when there was little known about mental health problems affecting ex-Service men and women who had returned home after serving in war and conflict zones.

Currently, the organisation is helping almost 6,000 people who are Veterans aged from 19 to 97.  Combat Stress are currently treating 971 Veterans who served in Afghanistan and 1,185 who served in Iraq.

Support is currently being given to those who suffer from:
Clinical depression
Raised anxiety states
Substance abuse (drug and alcohol)
Post traumatic stress disorder (PTSD)

This support is delivered throughout England, Scotland, Wales, and Northern Ireland; through three treatment centres (Hollybush House, Ayr, Ayrshire, Scotland; Audley Court, Newport, Shropshire, England and Tyrwhitt House, Leatherhead, Surrey, England). Hollybush House and Tyrwhitt House offer residential support and Audley Court operates as an outpatient base along with community outreach teams.

Services
Services are  provided by qualified professionals which include psychotherapists, Occupational Therapists,Nurses and Art Therapists  

Treatments for PTSD which include:
Cognitive behavioural therapy (CBT)
Trauma focused cognitive behavioural therapy  
Occupational Therapy
Behaviour therapy
Cognitive therapy
Solution-focused therapy
Art therapy
Anger management
Anxiety management
Sleep hygiene
Social skills training
Occupational and recreational therapies
Treatment centres
Tyrwhitt House in Leatherhead
Hollybush House in Ayr
Audley Court in Newport, Shrophire  

Leatherhead and Ayr offer a residential treatment service and Newport offers only outpatient treatment from 09.00 until 04.30 Monday to Friday.

See also
Veterans UK
The Royal British Legion
SSAFA
Army Benevolent Fund
Royal Air Forces Association
Mental health in the United Kingdom

Notes and references

Health charities in the United Kingdom
British veterans' organisations
Mental health organisations in the United Kingdom
Military of the United Kingdom
Post-traumatic stress disorder
1919 establishments in the United Kingdom
Organizations established in 1919